Štitar is a village and municipality in the Vukovar-Syrmia County in Croatia. According to the 2011 census it has 2,129 inhabitants.

References

Municipalities of Croatia
Populated places in Vukovar-Syrmia County
Populated places in Syrmia